III World Rhythmic Gymnastics Championships were held on 18 and 19 December 1967 in Copenhagen, Denmark.

Participants

Medal table

Individuals

Rope

Hoop

Freehand

All-Around

Groups

External links
Results

Rhythmic Gymnastics World Championships
1967 in gymnastics
1967 in Danish sport
International sports competitions in Copenhagen
International gymnastics competitions hosted by Denmark